Have We Met is the twelfth studio album by Canadian indie rock band Destroyer, released on January 31, 2020, by Merge Records and Dead Oceans.

Background and recording
Have We Met was initially conceived by group leader Dan Bejar as a "Y2K album" with instrumentals inspired by the music of Björk, Air, and Massive Attack and 90's trip hop. The concept was quickly scrapped, with Bejar later explaining in an interview with Stereogum, "It wasn't a sound that really conjured up anything to anyone." Bejar characterizes the album as a "record born of isolation" with the motif of "a couple individuals huddled around the glow of the computer light." The album features a return to Bejar's stream of consciousness lyrics, previously employed on Kaputt (2011).

The album's recording style marks a shift from the band-orientated recording approach of previous Destroyer albums. Bejar recorded vocals for the album at night at his kitchen table, singing into a microphone connected to his laptop running GarageBand. He sent the vocals as well as demos of the album's songs to longtime producer John Collins, who worked on the songs on his laptop and iPad for three months at his home in Seattle, adding layers of synthesizers and rhythm sections with guitar lines by Nicolas Bragg. Collins also used fragments from previous Destroyer recording sessions to create soundscapes, including saxophone from Kaputt and trumpet from Poison Season (2015).

Collins also produced and mixed the album. Commenting on Collins's involvement. Bejar said "I'd just give the whole thing to John and have him just blow it up, flesh it out -- swap out my s--tty fake drums for cool drums, and play bass on it, and make the synths cool and not generic, and make the songs move." Most of the finished tracks on the album feature the first or seconds takes of the vocals that Bejar recorded. Bejar initially never planned to use the vocal recordings, calling them "the most piss-poor things that I've done since" the Destroyer album We'll Build Them a Golden Bridge (1995) which he recorded on 4-track. However, he became attached to the first takes he recorded since he felt they captured a vibe that "was enough to anchor the whole record."

In its press release and subsequent interviews, Bejar said the album was partially influenced by 1980s films, including White Nights (1985) and  Pretty in Pink (1986) in an attempt to make the album "really film noir-ish and spooky." The album was also influenced by the minimalism of 1980s hip hop music, the soundtracks of Korean horror movies, the five-hour director's cut of Until the End of the World (1991), and Leonard Cohen's last albums. Bejar admits the finished album was "more poppy than I envisioned."

Music and lyrics
"University Hill" is a reference to University Endowment Lands, located west of Vancouver, where Bejar lived when he was young. Speaking with The Quietus, Bejar describes the lyrics of Have We Met as "the most grotesque" when "compared to all other Destroyer records."

Release
The album was announced on October 22, 2019, and "Crimson Tide" was released as its first single with an accompanying music video directed by David Galloway. A North American tour in support of the album was announced the same day, beginning in February 2020. "It Just Doesn't Happen" was released as the album's second single on November 19, 2019, accompanied by a music video featuring a snowmobile rider driving in the dark. "Cue Synthesizer" was released as the album's third single on January 8, 2020, accompanied by a music video directed by David Ehrenreich.

Critical reception

Jason Anderson of Uncut praised the album's "plusher aesthetic and eager melodicism" and singled out "Crimson Tide", "The Raven" and "The Man in Black's Blues" as "irresistible examples of Bejar's blend of soft rock, dream-pop and more idiosyncratic elements." Danny Eccleston of Mojo gave the album a positive review, characterizing it as "a richly inventive 21st century version of mid-'80s UK art pop." Writing for Exclaim, Matthew Blenkarn characterized the lyrics of the tracks "The Television Music Supervisor," and "Crimson Tide" as "dead end," concluding "it makes for immersive listening, even when tracks fail to sustain themselves."

Year-end lists

Track listing

Notes
 "Foolssong" is stylized in all lowercase.

Personnel
Credits adapted from the liner notes of Have We Met.
 Dan Bejar – vocals, synthesizer
 John Collins – production, mixing, bass, synthesizer, drum programming, granular synthesis
 Nicolas Bragg – guitar
 Joe LaPorta – mastering
 Maegan Hill-Carroll – front and back cover photos, design

Charts

See also
List of 2020 albums

References

2020 albums
Destroyer (band) albums
Merge Records albums
Dead Oceans albums
Albums produced by John Collins (Canadian musician)